Rawbelle is a locality in the North Burnett Region, Queensland, Australia.

Heritage listings 
Rawbelle has a number of heritage-listed sites, including:

 off Old Rawbelle Road: Rawbelle Cemetery and Homestead Site

References 

North Burnett Region
Localities in Queensland